Langa is a village in Lääne-Harju Parish, Harju County in northern Estonia.

References

External links
 Map of Lääne-Harju Parish

Villages in Harju County